Bell Plain Township, Township 29 North, Range 1 West, is located in Marshall County, Illinois.  It includes the villages of Pattonsburg and La Rose and is traversed by State Highway 29 and the BNSF Railway.

As of the 2010 census, its population was 400 and it contained 169 housing units.

Geography

Demographics

References

External links
City-data.com
Illinois State Archives

Townships in Marshall County, Illinois
Peoria metropolitan area, Illinois
Townships in Illinois
1849 establishments in Illinois